The Basic Education Certificate Examination (BECE) is the main examination to qualify students for admission into secondary and vocational schools in Ghana, and Nigeria. It is written after three years of junior secondary education.  It is administered by the Ghana Education Service under the Ministry of Education. In Nigeria, it is administered by the state ministry of education in each state under the supervision of the
National Examinations Council (NECO). NECO directly organizes examinations for Unity Schools, Armed Forces Secondary Schools and other Federal Government schools.
Candidates in the third year of junior high schools approved by the Ghana Education Service are eligible for the examination. It is conducted annually in June (Ghana), May/June (Nigeria).

All subjects  questions  and  answers

Tested subjects (Ghana)
English Language 
 Mathematics
 Integrated Science
 Social Studies 
 Religious and Moral Education
 French 
(Optional)
 Ghanaian language (any Ghanaian language offered at candidate's school)
 Basic Design and Technology (Visual arts, Home Economics, Pre-Technical Skills)
 Information Communication and Technology
English language

Tested subjects (Nigeria)
English Language
Mathematics
National Values Education (Including Civic Education, Social Studies and Christian/Islamic Religious Studies) 
Basic Science and Technology
Cultural and Creative Arts
Pre-vocational Studies
Foreign Language (French or Arabic)
Nigerian Language (Edo, Efik, Hausa, Igbo or Yoruba) 
Business Studies
History (starting 2021)

Registration

Schools approved by the Ghana Education Service or NECO are eligible to register students for the BECE each year. The six-week entry period begins in October and ends in November. Participating schools upload their Statement of Entries and School Choice Files via the Internet for processing. Continuous Assessment Scores are submitted to the council on compact discs.

Candidate grading and selection

The examination consists of multiple-choice and written questions, and Continuous (Internal) Assessment marks provided by the schools. In Ghana, candidates are graded on a nine-point scale, with Grade 1 for highest performance and Grade 9 for lowest.
                                                     
From 2017–Date, Candidates in Nigeria have been graded on a non-linear 5 point scale from      
A(Distinction) The highest grade
B(Upper Credit)                                                                                                                                                  
C(Lower Credit)
P(Pass)
F(Fail) The lowest grade. 
Before 2017, it was graded on a non-linear 4 point scale:
A(Distinction) The highest grade                                                                                                                                                         
C(Credit)                                                                                                                                                  
P(Pass)
F(Fail) The lowest grade

The Ghana Education Service uses its Computerized School Selection and Placement System to place successful BECE examinees in senior high schools, technical institutes and vocational institutions. In Nigeria, each school determines the appropriate placement of students in either Science, Arts, Commercial or vocational study tracks based on their BECE results.

Review of scripts

Scripts (graded tests) are kept for three months, then destroyed. During this time, they may be examined, for a fee, though by the authorization of a school's head or its accredited representative.

Certification

Certificates for successful candidates are produced within a month after results are released, and are sent to schools for collection by individual candidates. Certificates lost or damaged after collection are not replaced.

2015 Cancellation

The 2015 BECE began Monday, June 15, with the English Language and Religious and Moral Education papers, and was scheduled to end Friday, June 19, with the Information Communication Technology (ICT) paper. On Wednesday, June 17, two days into the examinations, the West Africa Examinations Council cancelled five subjects, claiming the papers had been 'compromised' and that cancellation was necessary to safeguard both the integrity of the examinations and subsequent certificates. In its official statement, WAEC explained that leakage of the test was so widespread, some questions had been shared on the WhatsApp messaging platform.

The following papers were cancelled:
 English language 2
 Religious and Moral Education 2
 Integrated Science 2
 Mathematics 2
 Social Studies 2

The cancelled papers were re-administered on June 29 and June 30, 2015.

References 

Education in Ghana
Education in Nigeria